Ethmia wursteri is a moth in the family Depressariidae. It was described by Hans Georg Amsel in 1956. It is found in Jordan.

References

Moths described in 1956
wursteri